Abiko Station (我孫子駅) is the name of two train stations in Japan:

 Abiko Station (Chiba) in Abiko, Chiba Prefecture, on the JR East Joban Line and the Narita Line
 Abiko Station (Osaka) in Sumiyoshi-ku, Osaka, on the Osaka Municipal Subway Midosuji Line